Aldan is a borough in Delaware County, Pennsylvania. The population was 4,152 at the 2010 census.

Geography

Transportation

No numbered highways serve Aldan directly. The main thoroughfares include Providence Road and Clifton Avenue, which intersect near the center of town.

Demographics

As of 2010 census, the racial makeup of the borough was 76.3% White, 18.5% African American, 0.1% Native American, 2.6% Asian, 0.4% from other races, and 2.0% from two or more races. Hispanic or Latino of any race were 2.1% of the population .

As of the census, of 2000, there were 4,313 people, 1,751 households, and 1,157 families residing in the borough. The population density was 7,235.4 people per square mile (2,775.4/km2). There were 1,817 housing units at an average density of 3,048.1 per square mile (1,169.2/km2). The racial makeup of the borough was 93.30% White, 4.34% African American, 0.19% Native American, 1.34% Asian, 0.12% from other races, and 0.72% from two or more races. Hispanic or Latino of any race were 0.93% of the population.

There were 1,751 households, out of which 28.6% had children under the age of 18 living with them, 51.6% were married couples living together, 10.1% had a female householder with no husband present, and 33.9% were non-families. 29.5% of all households were made up of individuals, and 12.8% had someone living alone who was 65 years of age or older. The average household size was 2.46 and the average family size was 3.08.

In the borough the population was spread out, with 22.8% under the age of 18, 6.9% from 18 to 24, 30.4% from 25 to 44, 24.1% from 45 to 64, and 15.9% who were 65 years of age or older. The median age was 39 years. For every 100 females there were 90.3 males. For every 100 females age 18 and over, there were 86.1 males.

The median income for a household in the borough was $47,292, and the median income for a family was $59,595. Males had a median income of $42,047 versus $31,129 for females. The per capita income for the borough was $22,134. About 4.0% of families and 5.9% of the population were below the poverty line, including 6.5% of those under age 18 and 12.4% of those age 65 or over.

Notable features 
Aldan has a Trolley Stop Museum, a swim club, a non-denominational church named Aldan Union Church, a Municipal Building, and a Veterans Memorial that has been expanded into a park right outside of Aldan Elementary.

Parks
 Aldan Gateway Park (2007)
 Aldan Veterans Memorial Park (2000–Present), dedicated to the veterans of Aldan, There is playground equipment in the background of the park.
 Carr Field (1990s), has two baseball fields and basketball court.
 Duffy Field (1990s)
 Jack Edmundson Park (2007), dedicated to Jack P. Edmundson, former mayor.  It was formerly known as the Triangle and located at W. Providence Road at Ridley Avenue.
 Providence Park (2006), former historical house purchased by Aldan Union Church and converted into a park.

Education
William Penn School District serves Aldan.
 Aldan Elementary School (K-6)
 Penn Wood Middle School (7-8) (Darby)
 Penn Wood High School, Cypress Street Campus (9-10) (Yeadon)
 Penn Wood High School, Green Ave Campus (11-12) (Lansdowne)

References

External links

Official Borough Website

1893 establishments in Pennsylvania
Boroughs in Delaware County, Pennsylvania
Boroughs in Pennsylvania
Populated places established in 1893